Pieter Boudewijn Richard de Geus (23 February 1929 in Rotterdam – 5 May 2004 in Maassluis) was a Dutch politician.

See also
 Eurostat

References
Drs. P.B.R. (Pieter) de Geus at www.parlement.com

1929 births
2004 deaths
Dutch civil servants
Royal Netherlands Navy personnel
Erasmus University Rotterdam alumni
Ministers of Defence of the Netherlands
Politicians from Rotterdam
Christian Democratic Appeal politicians
Christian Historical Union politicians
20th-century Dutch politicians